Wajdi Sinen (born 17 September 1990) is a Tunisian-born Qatari handball player for Al Rayyan and the Qatari national team.

He participated at the 2017 World Men's Handball Championship.

References

1990 births
Living people
Qatari male handball players
Handball players at the 2010 Asian Games
Handball players at the 2018 Asian Games
Asian Games gold medalists for Qatar
Asian Games medalists in handball
Medalists at the 2018 Asian Games